Kürşad is a Turkish given name for males. Notable people with the name include:

 Kürşad Türkşen, American biochemist
 Kürşad Tüzmen (born 1958), Turkish civil servant

See also
 Kürsat

Turkish masculine given names